Anders Abraham Grafström (10 January 1790 – 24 July 1870) was a Swedish historian, priest and poet.

Life
Grafström was born in Sundsvall  in Västernorrland County, Sweden.
He studied at Uppsala University, where he was enrolled in 1809 and became a master's degree in 1815.
In 1819, he was the library secretary of Uppsala University. The following year he was named as a lecturer in history at the university, and he later taught at the Military Academy Karlberg. 

Grafström belonged to the literary circle centred on salon hostess. Malla Silfverstolpe (1782–1861).  He wrote a famous biography of  poet Frans Michael Franzén. Some of Grafström's poetry was set to music by the composer Johan Erik Nordblom (1788-1848).

Personal life
He was married in 1822 to Henriette Elisabeth Franzén  (1803-1833) and after her death to her half-sister Helena Sophia Franzén (1813-1891). His father-in-Law was Bishop Frans Michael Franzén (1772–1847).

His daughter Sofia Elisabeth Grafström (1839-1874) married teacher and folklorist Artur Hazelius (1833–1901) .

In his later years, Grafström was a vocal exponent of the expansion of the railway network into Norrland. 
He died at Umeå, aged 80.

Bibliography
 De lingua, originis gentis Sviogothicae indice. Upsala, 1811.
 Tal öfver Högstsalig Hans Majestät Konung Carl XIII, hållet på Gustavianska Lärosalen i Upsala, den 6 maj 1818. Stockholm, 1818.
 De Statu Rerum Sveciarum ad Mortem Ingialdi Illråda Dissertatio Historica. (Beteiligt Petrus Ephraim Oldberg und Johannes P. Bosén). Dissertation Upsala 1820.
 De reformatione religionis christianae post Lutherum continuata. Upsala, 1829.
 Skalde-försök. Stockholm, 1826–1832.
 Ett år i Sverige. Stockholm, 1827-35 (Ed. Christian Didrik Forssell).
 Sånger från Norrland. Stockholm, 1841.
 Nya sånger från Norrland. Stockholm, 1848.
 Samlade skaldestycken. Stockholm, 1864.

References

1790 births
1870 deaths
People from Sundsvall
Writers from Medelpad
Swedish male poets
Swedish male writers
Swedish-language poets
Members of the Swedish Academy
Uppsala University alumni
19th-century Swedish poets
19th-century male writers